Bois Doré is a French chateau-style mansion built in 1927 in Newport, Rhode Island. It was designed by New York architect Charles A. Platt for William Fahnestock, a New York banker. It is described as one of the last great houses built for Newport, and is a part of the Ochre Point-Cliffs Historic District.

Description
The 19,000-square-foot mansion is built of limestone in the French chateau style, and includes 25 bedrooms, a loggia and terrace, a 2,000 square foot grand ballroom, and is situated on four acres of land.

The property originally included a 4,428 square-foot carriage house on Webster Avenue, which was built in 1900. The carriage house was renovated and sold separately from the mansion in 2015.

History

Bois Doré was built in 1927. It was designed by New York architect Charles A. Platt for William Fahnestock, who came from a prominent New York banking family which founded Oppenheimer Holdings.

It was later owned by Cambell's Soup heiress, Elinor Winifred Dorrance Hill Ingersoll who married Vice Admiral Stuart Ingersoll, USN.

Later, it was owned by oil heiress Carolyn Mary Skelly, daughter of William Grove Skelly. She was once dubbed the "most robbed woman in the US" by the Boston Globe.

The mansion was sold in 2021 for $8.99 million.

References

Houses in Newport, Rhode Island
Gilded Age mansions
Historic district contributing properties in Rhode Island